James Ray Cable (1948 – December 3, 2013) was an American serial killer and rapist who murdered between three and at least five women and teenage girls in Kentucky between 1982 and 1990, all of which had occurred after he had been released from prison for a 1977 murder and rape. He was not linked to any of the killings until 2004, while he was imprisoned for a different crime. He died while awaiting trial for the murders in 2013.

First murder 
Little is known about Cable's childhood. Born in LaGrange, Kentucky in 1948, he was first arrested in 1971, on accusations of raping a 7-year-old girl in Owensboro. Later that year a jury convicted him and sentenced him to life imprisonment. Just under a year later, on June 11, 1972, Cable escaped from the Kentucky State Reformatory, but was later caught the same day, leading to Cable receiving an escape conviction.
 
In April 1977, 35-year-old Willie S. Daniels, who was serving a life sentence for manslaughter and two counts of robbery, was attacked by Cable in the prison's gym. Cable proceeded to strike Daniels with a steel rod across his head. Daniels was rushed to the prison's hospital where he died as a result of his injuries. Cable was convicted of first degree manslaughter the following year and was sentenced to serve 10 more years of his initial sentence.

Release and kidnapping conviction 
Three years later, Cable was paroled. In 1983, Cable was returned to prison for violating his parole. He was once again released in early 1986. In 1988, he was again returned to prison for harassment related to a court order which issued him to stay away from his estranged wife.

On April 5, 1990, Cable, along with accomplice Phillip Clopton, kidnapped a 15-year-old Louisville girl. They drove her to a campsite deep into the woods, where they both raped her before tying her to a tree. Cable briefly left the area to meet with his parole officer while Clopton stayed. Over the next three weeks, both would continuously rape, whip, and assault the girl. On April 26, Clopton was alone with the girl but forgot to chain her up, leading to her stealing his gun, shooting and killing him, and running away. She escaped the woods and alerted authorities, leading to Cable's arrest.

The girl told authorities that Cable and Clopton confessed to her that they had killed teens Sherry Wilson and Bridgett Allen, both 14, who had both been missing since January 25. After Clopton's death, his diary was searched and it contained evidence that Cable had confessed to him that he killed Helen Booth, 24, in 1989. It also linked Cable to a severed arm that had been found that March. At the time, Cable could not be conclusively linked to the murder, and on the kidnapping and rape charge, he was convicted and sentenced to 300 years in prison.

Implication in other murders 
In December 2003, DNA tests were carried out to attempt to link Cable to any unsolved crimes. When the tests were complete the following year, Cable was linked to, and subsequently charged with, three murders from the 1980s. The first of the these to occur was Sandra Kellems, 18: on June 8, 1982, Sandra Kellems was celebrating her 18th birthday. That day she decided to go to a friend's house in Owensboro. Kellems never arrived, and the next day her body was found under several trees and bushes. She had been sexually assaulted and killed by brick which was used to slam against her head. Her purse was not found in her possession. At the crime scene, police made plaster casts of footprints found in the area. The second of these was Oma Marie Bird, 26: on December 11, 1986, the body of 26-year-old Oma Marie Bird was found in an alleyway by two children walking to school. The final of these was the murder of Helen Booth, 24, which Cable was originally considered a suspect in: On May 11, 1989, the body of 24-year-old Helen V. Booth, who was pregnant, was found in Riverside Park. She had been raped, gagged, and bludgeoned to death.

The Kellems murder had been reopened in 2001, as well as the Bird case. Investigators in both cases began taking notes, and due to Cable being in and out of prison coincidently during the time the murders were committed, investigators began talking to him. That led to his DNA being taken, and it being matched. Following the breakthrough, prosecutors sought the death penalty if Cable were to be convicted. Cable was found competent to stand trial. However, in 2011, questions were raised about Cable receiving a death sentence due to him having an IQ of 70. Before he could go to trial, on December 3, 2013, Cable died in prison. He never confessed to the murders, despite DNA proving he was responsible beyond a reasonable doubt.

See also 
 List of serial killers in the United States

References 

1948 births
2013 deaths
20th-century American criminals
American male criminals
American people convicted of kidnapping
American people convicted of rape
American rapists
American serial killers
Criminals from Kentucky
Male serial killers
People from Oldham County, Kentucky
Prisoners who died in Kentucky detention
Serial killers who died in prison custody
Violence against women in the United States